Neville Lawrenson Ames (31 July 1891 – 21 March 1956) was an English first-class cricketer.

The son of Hugo Ames, he was born at Fulham and was educated at Radley College, where he captained the college cricket team in 1910. He made one appearance in first-class cricket for H. D. G. Leveson Gower's XI against Oxford University at Eastbourne in 1912. Batting twice during the match, he was dismissed without scoring by Neville Fraser in the teams first-innings, while in their second-innings was dismissed for the same score by the same bowler, with the fall of his wicket giving Oxford University victory by an innings and 38 runs. He served in the London Regiment as a lieutenant during the First World War. He relinquished his commission after the war in September 1921.

He died at Marylebone in March 1956.

References

External links

1891 births
1956 deaths
Military personnel from Middlesex
People from Fulham
People educated at Radley College
English cricketers
H. D. G. Leveson Gower's XI cricketers
London Regiment officers
British Army personnel of World War I